The Gertrude Rhinelander Waldo House is a French Renaissance revival mansion at 867 Madison Avenue on the corner of East 72nd Street on the Upper East Side of Manhattan in New York City. Completed in 1898, it was designed by the architecture firm of Kimball & Thompson and has been more specifically credited to Alexander Mackintosh, a British-born architect who worked for Kimball & Thompson from 1893 until 1898.

Gertrude Rhinelander Waldo, the New York heiress who commissioned the mansion, never actually moved in.

Architecture
The mansion was modeled on the chateaux of the Loire Valley in France. Architecture critic Henry Hope Reed Jr. has observed about it:

The fortress heritage of the rural, royal residences of the Loire was not lost in the transfer to New York. The roof-line is very fine....The Gothic is found in the high-pitched roof of slate, the high, ornate dormers and the tall chimneys. The enrichment is early Renaissance, especially at the center dormers on both facades of the building, which boast colonnettes, broken entablatures, finials on high bases, finials in relief and volutes. In fact, although the dormers are ebullient, ornamentation is everywhere, even in the diamond-shaped pattern in relief on the chimneys (traceable to Chambord).

The first floor was a large center hall with rooms on each side for reception and servants activities. The second floor housed the main salon, the dining room and the butler's pantry. The third floor was where the master bedroom was located while the fourth floor housed the servants quarters and guest bedrooms.

History
Although the house had been commissioned by Gertrude Rhinelander Waldo, the eccentric heiress never moved into it, preferring to live across the street. The building remained vacant until 1921, at which time the first floor was converted into stores and two apartments were carved out of the upper four floors. Commercial enterprises which have used the location at various times include an antique store, Christie's auction house and a Zabar's-owned restaurant.

The building was owned by the 867 Madison Corporation in the 1950s, which offered it to de Evia for sale or net lease in 1956. At that time, he created Denvia Realty Corporation with his partner Denning and they entered into a ten-year net lease, becoming the landlords of the building. At this time, de Evia and Denning began using the entire third floor for de Evia's studios, while the fourth floor, the lower floor of their original duplex, contained the living room, dining room, ballroom and de Evia's mother's bedroom. The fifth and top floor contained the master bedroom which had a bathroom at either end and the servants' rooms. Offices on the second floor were rented to the interior decorators Tate and Hall, among others. The shops on the street level included the Pharmacy on the corner and the Rhinelander Florist on the Madison Avenue side.

After meeting Vincent Fourcade in 1959, Denning started to entertain prospective decorating clients in the apartment while de Evia was at his Greenwich, Connecticut, estate. These included Ogden and Lillian Phipps and led to the forming of Denning & Fourcade.

By 1963, de Evia took the fifth floor and converted it into his own residence, opening up the smaller rooms. The 10 rooms on the fourth floor were at this time rented to the restaurateur Larry Ellman, owner of the Cattleman Restaurant.

During the Denvia net lease, the building was sold by the 867 Madison Avenue Corporation to Central Ison, Ltd. for US$590,000. 

Ralph Lauren obtained the net lease in 1983 and started a massive overhaul of the building to create his Ralph Lauren flagship store. Naomi Leff supervised the rehabilitation of the building. It took around 18 months working in the final months around the clock. Published figures put the cost around $14–15 million. Ownership of the building has changed several times during his lease; from US$6.4 million in 1984, five years later in 1989 it sold for US$43 million, and the most recent sale in 2005 was reported at a record US$80 million.

The Gertrude Rhinelander Waldo House was designated a New York City Landmark in 1976, and was added to the National Register of Historic Places in 1980.

Gallery

See also
List of New York City Landmarks
National Register of Historic Places listings in New York County, New York

References
Notes

External links

New York City Designated Landmarks in Manhattan
Houses on the National Register of Historic Places in Manhattan
Houses completed in 1898
French Renaissance Revival architecture
Renaissance Revival architecture in New York City
Upper East Side
Houses in Manhattan
Madison Avenue
Gilded Age mansions